Antarctica is a solo piano album by Richie Beirach. It was recorded in 1985 and released by Pathfinder.

Recording and music
The album of solo piano performances by Beirach was recorded at Mediasound, New York City, on September 12–14, 1985. All of the compositions are Beirach originals.

Release and reception

Antarctica was released by Pathfinder. The AllMusic reviewer wrote that Beirach "hits sometimes and misses at other times, but it's certainly good to hear something besides standards and hard bop, even when it's more mood than substance."

Track listing
"Antarctica Suite, Part One: The Ice Shelf"
"Antarctica Suite, Part One: Neptune's Bellows"
"Antarctica Suite, Part One: Penguins On Parade"
"Antarctica Suite, Part One: Deception Island"
"Antarctica Suite, Part Two: Mirage"
"Antarctica Suite, Part Two: Water Lilies (The Cloud)"
"Antarctica Suite, Part Two: The Empress"

Personnel
Richie Beirach – piano

References

1985 albums
Richie Beirach albums
Solo piano jazz albums